Atlanta Assembly was an automobile factory owned by Ford Motor Company in Hapeville, Georgia. The Atlanta Assembly plant was opened on December 1, 1947.
Harbour Consulting rated it as the most efficient auto plant in North America in 2006.  As part of The Way Forward plan, the plant was closed on October 27, 2006. 
Prior to the operation of this assembly plant, Ford operated another assembly plant and offices on Ponce de Leon Avenue near the old Sears headquarters building, in the Poncey-Highland neighborhood just northeast of Downtown Atlanta.

Car lines produced
The last car lines built at the plant were:
 1986–2007 Ford Taurus
 1986–2005 Mercury Sable

Other car lines built at the plant included: Ford Fairlane, Ford Fairmont, Ford Falcon, Ford Galaxie, Ford Granada, Ford LTD, Ford Ranchero, Ford Thunderbird, Ford Torino, Mercury Cougar, Mercury Marquis, Mercury Montego and Mercury Zephyr.

Closing in 2006

The plant closed in 2006. The plant was purchased for over $40 million by Jacoby Development, Inc., in June 2008. Demolition of the plant began in August 2008 and took approximately one year.

New location use

The site is expected to be used for the Aerotropolis Atlanta  "multi use" community of retail, office, and hotel developments as well as additional parking for the adjacent Hartsfield-Jackson International Airport.

On May 11, 2011 Porsche Cars North America announced plans to move their headquarters from the northern Atlanta suburb of Sandy Springs to Aerotropolis Atlanta. The complex includes a new office building and test track

See also
 List of Ford factories

References

External links

 FORD’S ATLANTA ASSEMBLY PLANT PROPERTY SOLD TO JACOBY; AEROTROPOLIS PLANNED, June 12, 2008 - Ford Media

Ford factories
Former motor vehicle assembly plants
Buildings and structures in Fulton County, Georgia
Hapeville, Georgia
Motor vehicle assembly plants in Georgia (U.S. state)
1947 establishments in Georgia (U.S. state)